Saurita intricata is a moth in the subfamily Arctiinae. It was described by Francis Walker in 1854. It is found in the Brazilian states of Espírito Santo  and Rio de Janeiro.

References

Moths described in 1854
Saurita